Mora IK (or Mora Ishockeyklubb) is a Swedish professional ice hockey club from Mora in northern Dalarna. After failing the 2019 SHL qualifiers, Mora has been relegated for play in the second-tier league, HockeyAllsvenskan. Mora has previously played 25 seasons in the top tier, including four seasons in Elitserien (as the SHL was called at the time).  The team has reached the finals of the Swedish Championships only once, in 1950, a match which they lost 7–2 to Djurgårdens IF.  Mora has played in the top two tiers of Swedish hockey since the 1944–45 season.

History
Mora IK was founded in 1935. In 1945, the club reached the top tier of ice hockey in Sweden for the first time, and participated in their first (and to date only) Swedish Championship final in 1950.  Mora yo-yoed in and out of the top league, Division 1, until 1966, when they managed to maintain a spot in Division 1 for nine consecutive seasons, which remains Mora's longest run in Sweden's top hockey league.  In 1975, Elitserien was founded as a new top-tier hockey league, and Mora failed to qualify for this new league. They would continue play in Division 1 in its new function as Sweden's second-tier league, for 29 years, until 2004 when they managed promotion to Elitserien for the first time.

The club took advantage of the 2004–05 NHL lockout to sign several NHL players, including Shawn Horcoff, Daniel Cleary and brothers Marian Hossa and Marcel Hossa. They finished 9th that season, a respectable position for a newly promoted team.  Mora finished 8th in both the 2005–06 and 2006–06 seasons, and accordingly participated in the Swedish Championship playoffs for the first time since 1970, but were eliminated in the quarterfinals each time. The 2007–08 Elitserien season resulted with Mora in 11th place, forcing them to play in the 2008 Elitserien qualifier (Kvalserien) to retain their spot in Elitserien.  They finished 4th in that tournament, resulting in relegation back to HockeyAllsvenskan.

During the 2012–13 NHL lockout, Bobby Ryan of the Anaheim Ducks and Anze Kopitar of the Stanley Cup-winning Los Angeles Kings joined the team to play with his brother, Gašper, for the duration of the lockout.  This period in the second tier came to an end after nine years when Mora defeated local rivals Leksands IF 4–2 in games in the 2017 SHL qualifiers, taking their spot in the top flight. Their rivalries are commonly referred to as Siljansderbyt (English: the Siljan derby). The team would once again face Leksand in the 2019 SHL qualifiers, after finishing 13th in the regular season, where they lost 4–1 in games to Leksand and thus were relegated to HockeyAllsvenskan while Leksand took their SHL spot for the next season.

Seasons-by-season records

'This is a partial list, featuring the five most recent completed seasons. For the full season-by-season history, see List of Mora IK seasonsPlayers and personnel
Current roster

Team captains

 Magnus Sandberg, 2003–06
 Jarno Kultanen, 2006–07
 Håkan Bogg, 2007–08
 Greger Artursson, 2009–10
 Niklas Fogström, 2010–11
 Peter Nolander, 2011–12
 Tobias Ericsson, 2012–13
 Jeremy Colliton, 2013–14
 Johan Alcén, 2013–14
 Kevin Mitchell, 2014–15
 Daniel Hermansson, 2015–16
 Emil Bejmo, 2016–17
 Tomas Skogs, 2017–18
 Adam Masuhr, 2018–20
 Mattias Nørstebø, 2020–21
 Daniel Ljunggren, 2021–present''

Honored members

References

External links

 

HockeyAllsvenskan teams
Ice hockey teams in Sweden
Sport in Mora, Sweden
1935 establishments in Sweden
Ice hockey clubs established in 1935
Ice hockey teams in Dalarna County